Brodie Jones (born 7 May 1998) is an Australian professional rugby league footballer who plays as a  forward for the Newcastle Knights in the NRL.

Background
Born in Maitland, New South Wales, Jones played his junior rugby league for the Cessnock Goannas, before being signed by the Newcastle Knights.

Playing career

Early years
Jones started playing for the Newcastle Knights' Harold Matthews Cup team in 2014, representing the New South Wales Under-16's, before moving up to the S. G. Ball Cup side in 2015. He also spent time playing with the Knights' National Youth Competition / Jersey Flegg Cup team from 2015 through to 2018, representing the New South Wales Under-18's in 2015 and 2016. In 2016, he was a part of the Australian Schoolboys squad. In 2019, he graduated to the Newcastle Knights Canterbury Cup NSW team. In November 2019, he re-signed with Newcastle on a one-year contract.

2020
In round 3 of the 2020 NRL season, Jones made his NRL debut for the Newcastle club against the Penrith Panthers.

2021
Jones made 21 appearances for Newcastle in the 2021 NRL season including the clubs elimination final loss against Parramatta.

References

External links
Newcastle Knights profile

1998 births
Living people
Australian rugby league players
Cessnock Goannas players
Newcastle Knights players
Rugby league players from Maitland, New South Wales
Rugby league second-rows